PRO Group, Inc. was a retailers' cooperative and distributors' cooperative. It was based in Denver, Colorado and was founded in 1953.

The company's retail formats included:
 PRO Hardware
 Farm Mart
 GardenMaster

It formerly had a division: National Paint Distributors, but that was disbanded.

On April 1st, 2022, PRO Group merged with Distribution America to form Hardlines Distribution Alliance (HDA).

Competitors 
 Val-Test Distributors
 Reliable Distributors
 Associated Building Materials Distributors

References 

 Focus on independence turns to Pro Group: Brief Article Home Channel News, Feb 5, 2001 by Scott Larson

External links 
 Pro Hardware website

American companies established in 1953
Retail companies established in 1953
Hardware stores of the United States
Companies based in Denver
Retailers' cooperatives in the United States